Calmes is a surname. Notable people with the surname include:

Albert Calmes (1881–1967), Luxembourgian economist and historian
Carole Calmes (born 1978), Luxembourgian sports shooter
Christian Calmes (1913–1995), Luxembourgian civil servant, lawyer and historian
Elisabeth Calmes (born 1947), Luxembourgian painter
Emile Calmes (born 1954), Luxembourgian politician
Jack Calmes (1943–2015), American inventor, executive and musician
Keith Calmes (born  1966), American guitarist, educator, composer and author
Marquis Calmes (1755–1834), American military leader
Selma Calmes (born 1940), American anesthesiologist and physician
William Calmes Buck (1790–1872), American Baptist minister, author and editor and commentator on slavery

References